Michèle Plomer (born 1965, Montreal, Quebec) is a Canadian writer and translator. She is a recipient of the :fr:Prix Alfred Desrochers and the Prix France-Québec.

Biography
Her writing demonstrates her love of the Eastern Townships, where she lives, and her time in south China, where she taught English for three years at Shenzhen University. She was included in a list of authors of avant-garde Quebec novels. She participated in the 2014 and 2017 editions of the  literary festival. Plomer was a finalist for the 2017 Prix des libraires. She is also co-publisher of the Magog publishing house, Chauve-souris.

Awards and honours
 2007, Prix Alfred Desrochers
 2010, Prix France-Québec

Selected works

Novels 
 2007, Le jardin sablier  
 1020, HKPQ 
 2011, Dragonville, vol. 1 : Porcelaine 
 2012, Dragonville, vol. 2 : Encre 
 2013, Dragonville, vol. 3 : Empois 
 2016, Étincelle 
 2018, La petite voleuse de perles 
 2019, Habiller le cœur

Children's literature
 2015, Sueurs froides 
 2021, À l'eau

Short stories 
 2018, "Moucheuse", in Treize à table, edited by Chrystine Brouillet and Geneviève Lefebvre

Translation 
 2017, Les gens de Shenzhen, by Xue Yiwei

Essays 
 2022, À nos filles, Michèle Plomer and Justine Latour

References

1965 births
Living people
Writers from Montreal
21st-century Canadian novelists
Canadian women novelists
Canadian novelists in French
Canadian children's writers in French
Canadian women children's writers